The Hyundai Veloster is a liftback coupé first produced in 2011 by Hyundai, with sales beginning in South Korea on March 10, 2011, and in Canada and the United States since the fall of 2011. In South Korea, it is marketed under Hyundai's 'Premium Youth Lab'. It was unveiled on January 10, 2011, at the Detroit Auto Show, and fills the void left when Hyundai discontinued the Hyundai Tiburon after the 2008 model year.

The car differs from many competitors with its asymmetrical door configuration, featuring one large door on the driver side and two smaller doors on the passenger side. This configuration is more common on commercial vehicles and minivans. In North America, the Veloster is equipped with Blue Link, a new telematics system which will eventually be standard on all Hyundai models. The system is comparable to OnStar in GM vehicles, and provides customers with automatic crash notification, vehicle diagnostics, and remote control of vehicle features, among others.

Development and early concepts

HND-3 concept (2007)

The Hyundai HND-3 concept was the third sport compact concept car styled at Hyundai's Design and Technical Center. It included 2.0-liter DOHC Theta inline four-cylinder engine and five-speed automatic transmission. The concept car became a Veloster Coupe in 2011.

The car concept was unveiled at the 2007 Seoul Motor Show, with the final production version released on January 11 at the Detroit Auto Show. The Veloster is developed under the codename FS, and is built on a modified version of the Cee'd's front-wheel drive platform.

First generation (FS; 2011) 

A six-speed manual transmission is standard while a six-speed dual-clutch transmission (DCT) with paddle shifters is available as an option. The DCT transmission was developed by Hyundai and is the first dual-clutch transmission from the company. Official EPA fuel economy numbers are  city,  highway and  combined for the manual while the dual clutch does  city,  highway and  combined. For some markets like the Middle East, Chile and Brazil, the car is offered without GDI, making 128 hp.

Pricing starts at US$17,800 in the U.S., and CAD in Canada excluding taxes and the destination fee. In the United States, two option packages are available: a style package and a tech package. Purchase of the tech package requires purchase of the style package as well. Options are not available outside the package, thus resulting in three trim levels: base, style, and tech. Each trim level is available with the DCT (optional) or manual transmission (standard).

Michelin Pilot Super Sport 215/40ZR18 tires option was added to U.S. vehicle models with 18-inch wheels since 2012.In the UK, the car starts at GBP OTR ("on the road", which includes delivery and 1st year VED). European models do not have the option of tech or style packs and are instead split between two trim levels: Veloster Coupe and Veloster Coupe Sport. The sport model adds a panoramic sunroof, 18 inch wheels and full leather interior to the base model car. Cars for the European market come as standard with a 6-speed manual transmission and have the option of a DCT automatic gearbox. The range in Europe also includes a "BlueDrive" option, which adds low rolling resistance tires and stop-start technology to the engine in order to reduce emissions, but only on the entry level car.

Unlike the Mini Clubman, which features a pair of bi-parting side doors that are always located on the right of the car (irrespective of the market), the Veloster has different left and right hand drive configurations.  The larger single door is always on the driver's side, and the two smaller doors are always on the passenger side. As a result, the rear passenger always exits on the curb side of the vehicle.

Veloster Turbo (2012–)

The Veloster Turbo uses a 1.6L T-GDi Gamma engine that has different outputs depending on the market. In other markets, such as Europe, it receives a lower-power engine outputting  at 5,500 rpm with the same 265 Nm of torque, but altered to come earlier in the rev range at 1500 rpm. A possible reason for the European market receiving the lower-powered engine may be because the Kia Pro Cee'd GT already makes use of the 150 kW engine. The car has three doors in North America and in Europe, making the Veloster Turbo's shooting brake body style both in North America and in Europe a relative novelty.

The Turbo further receives new body panels which add LED lights, very large twin exhausts, side skirts, a much larger front grille, turbo badging and extra equipment as standard, including push button start (satnav and back-up camera available on top trim level). The matte grey paint option is also available on the Turbo.

The Veloster Turbo was unveiled at the 2012 North American International Auto Show. The model shown was a concept vehicle with a special graphics package featuring a gray and yellow stripe running the length of the car, yellow trim on the front spoiler, side skirts and rear fascia, as well as a checkered flag theme on the side and roof spoiler and was also unveiled at the 2012 Chicago Auto Show.

The North American model went on sale in summer 2012 as a 2013 model year vehicle, with the choice of either a six-speed manual transmission or a six-speed automatic transmission with Shiftronic. The European version is only available with manual transmission.

The Veloster skipped production for 2017, as Hyundai prepared a new model for 2018.

Special editions and concepts

2011 SEMA concepts (2011)
The 2011 ARK Performance Veloster is a modified, rally-inspired Veloster which began as a non turbo model, and was built for the SEMA show. The engine is rated at an estimated 210 hp and features a new twin scroll turbocharger, intercooler, turbo manifold, downpipe and dual exhaust, all developed by ARK. Other modifications include an oil cooler, a lightweight pulley system, bigger 6 piston brakes, anti-roll bars, coilover suspension and new control arms. Modifications to the exterior include a green and black paint scheme, a body kit with new front lip spoiler, side skirts, rear bumper and wide-body fender kit, ARK grille, rear wing mount, custom lights and Rally Armor mudflaps.

The 2011 PM Lifestyle Veloster started out as a non turbo Veloster and was developed and modified by students at the Universal Technical Institute. It includes Konig wheels, a carbon fiber hood by Seibon, a custom "Peanut Butter" leather interior, an upgraded audio system, a performance intake and exhaust, bigger brakes, a nitrous kit, coilover suspension, a Sequence-X body kit and a bright blue paint job. Power is estimated to be around 163 hp.

The Hyundai Re:Mix Music Veloster is an audio-themed car with a full DJ deck setup installed in the trunk.

The Re:Mix Gaming Veloster featured a video game theme, with an Xbox in place of the DJ booth.

The RMR Global Rallycross Veloster is a race car built by Rhys Millen Racing for 2WD Rallycross race.

2012 SEMA concepts (2012)
The Veloster Velocity concept is a concept vehicle based on the Veloster 1.6 GDi with customized engine modifications by Cosworth (including performance pistons, rods, turbocharger, intercooler, intake manifold, intake-charging design, fuel system and engine management), custom exhaust system by CPR Fabrication, Sparco A1 WTX 5H Helmets, gloves, shoes, and seat belts; Race-Keeper Video GPS data acquisition system, Katzkin custom suede leather interior (Raven and scarlet themed suede with red stitching), CPR Integrated Roll Bar, Velocity HATCI design body kit (front and rear braking airflow ducts, lift-reducing rear diffuser, integrated front splitter, aero side skirt lip, oversized rear wing spoiler), #1 racing number design motif, HRE P40 model 19 x 9.0" lightweight satin-charcoal wheels, Brembo brakes (350x28mm two-piece rotors and 4-piston calipers), Bilstein monotube dampers and spring kit, Kumho Ecsta SPT 275/35R19 high performance summer tires.

The JP Edition Veloster is a concept vehicle based on the Hyundai Veloster and produced in association with John Pangilinan. It features a Mint Green body colour, ARK performance exhaust, Lucas Oil, TS Designs metal fender flares designed by Jon Sibal, BASF Mint Green paint painted by Auto Explosion, Brembo big brake kit, KW Coilovers with ARK Performance lowering springs, Whiteline sway bars, anti-lift caster kit and end links; Rays Gram Lights Xtreme57 wheels (19 x 9.5 inches) Toyo Tires Proxes T1 Sport (265/30 R19), Recaro Cross Sportster CS seats, Takata harnesses, re-upholstery by Infinite Auto Design, Alpine Electronics System built by BP Auto Sound (MRX-F35 350 watt 4 channel amplifier, 2 MRX-M55 550 watt mono amplifiers, 2 SWS-12D4 12-inch subwoofers, SPR-60C 6.5-inch component speakers, SPR-60 6.5-inch coaxial speakers, Kinetik battery and power supply, V-LEDs lighting.

The vehicles were unveiled at the 2012 SEMA Show.

Veloster C3 Roll Top concept (2012)
The Veloster C3 Roll Top concept is a version of the Veloster 1.6 GDi, inspired by the proverb 'A rolling stone gathers no moss'. Designed by Hyundai Design North America, it included a canvas roof that opens to the rear or windshield of the vehicle, a fixed-gear bike, a flat black spoiler, glass close out and convertible top rails, black rear reflector bezels, license plate pocket and badge; upfront flat red mirror housings, black front wheels, fog lamp bezels, front grille and badging; flat teal rear wheels, red reflectors and smoked taillights, Large free flowing circular exhaust pipes, big, bold hexagonal front grille, sculpted side skirts, diffuser vents in the lower rear fascia, 18-inch wheels with chrome inserts, 8 individual headlight LED accents.

The vehicle was unveiled at the 2012 LA Auto Show.

Veloster RE:MIX (2012)
The Veloster RE:MIX is a version of the Hyundai Veloster inspired by Hyundai's RE:MIX Lab program. It features a unique body kit, gunmetal-finish alloy wheels and a premium audio system. The vehicle was unveiled at the 2012 SEMA show. U.S. models arrived at dealerships in December 2012.

Hyundai Veloster Zombie Survival Machine concept (2013)
The Veloster Zombie Survival Machine concept is a version of the 2013 Hyundai Veloster Turbo built by Galpin Auto Sports for The Walking Dead Chop Shop. It features a baseball bat with spikes mounted to the trunk, knife blades that pop out of the rear bumper, a double-barrel shotgun with mount, a front bumper "horde plow", a roof-mounted PA system with a "doom whistle", a slit-panel armor-plated front windshield, Vitamin C textured paint, hand-fabricated armor, storage solutions for ammo, weapons and a first-aid kit; cupholders replaced by machete holders mounted on either side of the seats.

The vehicle was unveiled at The Future US Booth at the 2013 San Diego Comic-Con.

Veloster RE:FLEX Edition (2014)
The Veloster RE:FLEX Edition is a limited (3000 units) version of the 2014 Hyundai Veloster 1.6 Gamma GDi with six-speed EcoShift dual-clutch transmission. It features black or red full leather seating, projector headlights with LED headlight accents, LED taillights, LED illuminated door sills, 18-inch alloy wheels with a PVD chrome finish, chrome hood accents, chrome door handles and RE:FLEX badging on the exterior and floor mats.

The vehicle was unveiled at the 2014 Chicago Auto Show. U.S. model went on sale for $21,650 excluding freight, and includes all of the Veloster DCT Style Package equipment excluding the panoramic roof.

Veloster Rally Edition (2016) 
The Veloster Rally Edition is a limited (1200 Units) version of the 2016 model-year Hyundai Veloster Turbo 1.6 Gamma TCi GDi paired with a 6-speed manual transmission.

The exterior of the vehicle features a Rally Edition-only matte Marathon Blue paint colour, RAYS Rally Edition wheels, carbon fibre side accents and front-lip, and most noticeably a full-metal roof for weight savings, rather than the standard glass panoramic sunroof of the standard Turbo model. The Rally Edition also features a matte-grey front grill sill, like its standard Turbo counterpart.

The interior of the vehicle is nearly unchanged from the standard Turbo model, with the exception of blue coloured interior accents (interior door handles, centre console handles), and repositioning of the Turbo logo from the centre of the seats to the side bolsters nearest the door, which are also coloured blue. The Rally Edition also comes with Rally Edition floor mats.

In terms of performance, the Rally Edition has no difference in performance characteristics to its standard Turbo counterpart. The Rally Edition does feature a retuned suspension, and calibrated driver selectable power-steering (the same as the R-Spec) for stiffer steering response.

Veloster Rally Sport Canadian Edition (2016) 

The Veloster Rally Sport Canadian Edition is a limited Canadian version available only for the 2016 model-year.

The vehicle is available only in the RS Silver paint colour. It features the same engine as the Rally Edition combined with the 6-speed manual, 7-speed automatic DCT transmission, the Base model body, 17" 5-spoke wheels, and a carbon fibre body-color hood and full-metal roof to save weight. The Rally Sport is visually identifiable from a standard Base model only by the wheels, larger 225-50R17 tires, small silver Turbo emblems on the lower rear quarter panels behind the doors, and a black Turbo emblem on the rear hatch.

The interior of the vehicle is unchanged from the standard Base model.

In terms of performance, the Rally Sport Canadian Edition has no significant performance differences when compared to the standard Turbo counterpart. The Rally Sport Canadian Edition does feature the same retuned suspension and calibrated driver selectable power-steering for stiffer steering response as the Rally Edition.

Powertrain 

USA and Australian models include Veloster Gamma 1.6 GDi, Veloster Turbo 1.6 TCi GDi (204PS), while European models include the Gamma 1.6 GDi and Veloster Turbo GDi (186PS).

Safety
Euro NCAP test results for a LHD, 3-door hatchback variant on a 2011 registration:

Production
Hyundai recalled certain model year 2012 Veloster vehicles manufactured from November 1, 2011, through April 17, 2012 and equipped with panoramic sunroofs, for possible weakened sunroof during installation at the factory. The safety recall began on January 22, 2013. In addition, model year 2012 Veloster vehicles manufactured from July 2, 2011, through February 27, 2012 and equipped with manual transmissions were recalled for binding of parking brake components caused by moisture and road grime.

Motorsports
Rhys Millen drove a version of Veloster race car with a 2-litre engine rated 500 hp with all wheel drive in the Summer X Games during 2011 US Rallycross Championship Series. The partnership between Rhys Millen Racing and Hyundai Motor America continued for 2012 Global RallyCross Championship season. After Hyundai had announced it would no longer participate in North American motorsports, the 2011 Hyundai Veloster Global RallyCross race cars went on sale starting January 1, 2013.

Marketing
Hyundai partnered with the Rhys Millen Red Bull Rallycross team in the 2011 U.S.A Rallycross Championship. During the six planned races in 2011, the on-site activity focused on the performance-tuned production vehicles, Genesis Coupe and Veloster, and local brand managers gave attendees tours of the cars and collected attendee data via surveys on buyer interest and brand consideration. Large screens played race footage and rallycross highlights. In the pit area, which was open to all ticket holders, consumers could sit in the vehicles, pick up free merchandise and meet the drivers. The attendee area of the pit was housed in a 53-foot Featherlite spread-axle trailer that the race team operated on one side, while an on-site Hyundai activity area functioned on the other.

A TV commercial titled 'Cheetah', featuring a caged cheetah set to race a new 201 horsepower Veloster Turbo on a long stretch of open road, was premiered during the first quarter of 2012 Super Bowl.

In January 2012, Turn 10 Studios announced on the official Forza Motorsport 4 website that the 2013 Hyundai Veloster Turbo as well as Rhys Millen's Veloster Rally Car are available as a free downloadable content for the game.

In Brazil the car has been the subject of controversy as Hyundai advertised the GDi injection but only brought the MPI DUAL injection to market. Consumers who pre-ordered the car were forced to accept the non-GDi vehicle without any compensation or cancel the transaction forfeiting the 10% reservation deposit. Despite the fact that the engine is the same  as the Veloster sold in Chile, the vehicle's license specifies the car as having . Other advertised options were also not included in the vehicles sold in Brazil. This has led the Brazilian Public Ministry to start investigating Hyundai for fraudulent behavior.

As part of Hyundai Veloster Zombie Survival Machine premiere, Hyundai also developed a unique configurator app, the WalkingDeadChopShop.com, that allows fans to design a custom zombie survival machine, using the Hyundai Veloster Turbo, Santa Fe or Elantra. The submitted designs would be entered into a contest and the winning design would be constructed and unveiled in October at the New York Comic Con.

Second generation  (JS; 2018)  

Hyundai revealed the second-generation Veloster at the 2018 North American International Auto Show. It features a brand new design from the previous generation, still retaining the asymmetrical 2+1 door configuration. It also gets new safety equipment as standard on all trims, with forward-collision warning with automated emergency braking, lane-keeping assist, and a driver-attention monitor. All second-generation Velosters will now get multi-link suspension as standard (previously the non-turbo models from 1st-generation had a coupled torsion rear axle), and Torque Vectoring Control.

The Veloster lineup in the US originally included the base Veloster, the Veloster 2.0 Premium, the Veloster Turbo R-Spec, Veloster Turbo and the Veloster Turbo Ultimate.

Veloster N 

Released in 2019, the Veloster N was the first N model sold in North America. It is paired to a 6-speed manual transmission, with a newly announced 8-speed wet dual-clutch transmission announced in 2020. Both transmission models are paired with a turbocharged four-cylinder engine making up to 275 horsepower.

In April 2020, the Veloster N received a  new 8-speed wet dual-clutch transmission, which is claimed to enable the car to accelerate from 0 to 100 km/h in 5.6 seconds.

Powertrain

Veloster N ETCR 

The Veloster N ETCR is a battery electric racing vehicle with the drivetrain modified to accommodate mid-mounted motors and rear-wheel-drive. It debuted in September 2019 at IAA (Germany) and was campaigned in the FIA ETCR – eTouring Car World Cup series beginning with that series' inaugural season in 2021. It is the first electric racing car built by Hyundai.

The ETCR racer is assembled in Alzenau, Germany alongside other Hyundai N racing vehicles for rally and touring car series. Design work for the ETCR began in November 2018, and the prototype was first driven in August 2019. The final drivetrain specification was completed in 2020, and at the launch of the FIA PURE ETCR series in October of that year, Hyundai announced it would campaign the ETCR. A demonstration was held at the Daytona International Speedway during the 2021 Rolex 24 at Daytona.

In 2021, Hyundai driver Jean-Karl Vernay finished second in the PURE ETCR series, while Hyundai finished third (of three contestants) in the manufacturer's standings. The Veloster N ETCR returned for the second season in 2022, with the series rebranded to the eTouring Car World Championship. For 2023, Hyundai plan to race with a Ioniq 6-based vehicle and its modern E-GMP platform.

Discontinuation

In August 2020, Hyundai dropped all Veloster models except the Veloster N in Canada for unspecified reasons. In July 2021, citing slow sales, Hyundai similarly announced the discontinuation of all Veloster models in the United States for 2022 except for the high performance N variant. Hyundai will focus on its more popular offerings like the Kona instead.

Sales

Public Image 
In the United States Hyundai Velosters are starting to become noticed as being often aggressively driven on public roads. Insurify, a car insurance comparison website, determined from its database of 1.6 million insurance applications in 2019 that 14.48% of first-generation Veloster owners were responsible for speeding violations. This was the 10th highest at the time. This number rose to 15.43% on the basis of 2.5 million insurance requests in 2021 for the second-generation model thus now being at 6th place for most speeding violations of any car in its database. Using the same database it also ranked it the 8th highest for rude behavior on the basis of driving violations overall.

References

Notes

Citations

^<https://www.motortrend.com/cars/hyundai/veloster/2019/2019-hyundai-veloster-n-first-test-review/>

External links

 (N Performance)
 (Hyundai N)

Veloster
Sport compact cars
Hot hatches
Front-wheel-drive vehicles
Cars introduced in 2011
Euro NCAP small family cars